The 2006 Minnesota Senate election was held in the U.S. state of Minnesota on November 7, 2006, to elect members to the Senate of the 85th and 86th Minnesota Legislatures. A primary election was held in several districts on September 12, 2006.

The Minnesota Democratic–Farmer–Labor Party (DFL) won a majority of seats, remaining the majority party, followed by the Republican Party of Minnesota. The new Legislature convened on January 3, 2007.

Results

See also
 Minnesota House of Representatives election, 2006
 Minnesota gubernatorial election, 2006
 Minnesota elections, 2006

References

External links
 Color shaded map showing winning margin by district (PDF) from 2006 Election Maps, Minnesota Secretary of State

2006 Minnesota elections
Minnesota Senate
Minnesota Senate elections